Conidens is a genus of clingfishes found in the Pacific Ocean.

Species
There are currently two recognized species in this genus:
 Conidens laticephalus (S. Tanaka (I), 1909) (Broadhead clingfish)
 Conidens samoensis (Steindachner, 1906)

References

Gobiesocidae